Geological strata known to contain the fossils of the extinct group of reptiles known as phytosaurs occur predominantly in the United States and Europe.

List of formations

Phytosaur